Bernard Fonck (born 20 May 1973) is a Belgian equestrian specializing in reining. He won silver as part of the Belgian team at the 2010 FEI World Equestrian Games and the 2014 FEI World Equestrian Games in the team reining event, and became the second non-American to win gold at the individual reining event at the 2018 FEI World Equestrian Games, and another silver in the team event.

He is married to Ann Poels who also won silver in the team event on all three occasions.

Notes

1973 births
Living people
Belgian male equestrians
Reining
20th-century Belgian people
21st-century Belgian people